The Ford Evos is a low-slung mid-size crossover SUV produced by Ford through Changan Ford joint venture in China since 2021. The vehicle debuted at Auto Shanghai in China in April 2021.

History 

Developed largely by a China-based team of Ford, the Evos has been described as a mix between a crossover and a fastback or station wagon due to its low-slung proportion.

The interior of the Evos features a large touchscreen panel spanning  which consists of two displays, which are 12.3-inch digital instrument cluster and second is a 27-inch 4K infotainment display that runs on Ford Sync+ 2.0. The Evos also features BlueCruise, Ford's new Level 2 driver-assist technology. Other features include a "co-pilot" mode which allows the front passenger to take over their half of the huge display and relay pertinent information to the driver.

Journalists have speculated that the Evos will be a successor to the Fusion/Mondeo for North America and Europe due to low sales of the sedans and station wagons markets. However, it was confirmed that the Evos would not be available in North America.

References

External links

 

Evos
Cars introduced in 2021
Mid-size sport utility vehicles
Crossover sport utility vehicles
Hatchbacks
Front-wheel-drive vehicles
Cars of China